Sohrab Vossoughi is an Iranian–American entrepreneur, product designer and founder of Ziba Design, a design and innovation consultancy based in Portland, Oregon. He named BusinessWeek's Entrepreneur of the Year in 1992.

Early life
Sohrab was born in Tehran, Iran in 1956. He moved to the United States in 1971. After studying mechanical engineering for three years, he switched to study industrial design. He graduated from San Jose State University's Department of Industrial Design in 1979.

Career
Vossoughi joined Hewlett-Packard Corp. In 1982, he began independent consulting for startup companies in Portland, Oregon. By 1984, he had launched a product development firm he named ZIBA Design.

References

Iranian designers
People from Tehran
Industrial designers
Product designers
1956 births
Businesspeople from Portland, Oregon
Iranian businesspeople
Iranian emigrants to the United States
San Jose State University alumni
Living people